This is a list of flag bearers who have represented Comoros at the Olympics.

Flag bearers carry the national flag of their country at the opening ceremony of the Olympic Games.

See also
Comoros at the Olympics

References

Comoros at the Olympics
Comoros
Olympic flagbearers